MARVEL domain-containing protein 2 is a protein that in humans is encoded by the MARVELD2 gene.

References

Further reading